Dignan Porch is a DIY indie rock band from Tooting Broadway, London. They began as the bedroom recording project of songwriter Joseph Walsh, then grew into a full band, creating music that has been described by critics as a combination of Lo-fi, indie rock, pop and punk.

History
The band have found a cult-like following thanks to releases on Captured Tracks and Faux Discx and a long-running residency at The Windmill, Brixton. They have released three albums and a number of EP's and singles. Second album Nothing bad will ever happen is known for having been recorded live on reel-to-reel tape and with very few overdubs, an approach rarely used in contemporary pop music, even in the indie world.

Members

Current
 Joe Walsh - Vocals, Guitar (2010–present)
 Sam Walsh - Guitar (2010?–present)
 Ben Goodwin - Bass (2010?–present)
 Hayley Akins - Keyboard, Vocals (2010?–present)
 Luke Walsh - Drums (2013?–present)

Former
 Stephen Keane - Drums (2010?–2013?)

Timeline

Discography

Studio albums
Tendrils (2010)
Nothing Bad Will Ever Happen (2012, Captured Tracks)
Observatory (2014, Faux Discx)
Secretions (2018)
Electric Threads (2023, Hidden Bay/Safe Suburban Home/Repeating Cloud)

EPs
Deluded (2011)
crème (2015, Edils Recodrings)

References

English indie rock groups
Captured Tracks artists